Hendrickson may refer to:

Things
 Hendrickson Holdings, a United States manufacturer of truck suspensions
 20317 Hendrickson, a main-belt asteroid
 Hendrickson Organ Company, a manufacturer of pipe organs
 Hendrickson Publishers, an academic Christian publisher

Places
 Hendrickson Township, Hubbard County, Minnesota, United States
 Hendrickson, Missouri, United States

People
 Adam Hendrickson, New York City Ballet soloist
 Ben Hendrickson (born 1981), American baseball pitcher
 Benjamin Hendrickson (1950–2006), American actor
 Darby Hendrickson (born 1972), American ice hockey centre
 Darin Hendrickson, American baseball coach
 Dwight Hendrickson, fictional character in Haven
 Elizabeth Hendrickson (born 1979), American actress
 Ezra Hendrickson (born 1972), Vincentian footballer
 Horace Hendrickson (20th century), American football coach
 Jack Hendrickson, Canadian professional ice hockey player
 John H. Hendrickson (born 1871), American Olympic sport shooter
 Mark Hendrickson (born 1974), American professional athlete
 Robert C. Hendrickson (1898–1964), American politician
 Robert Hendrickson (director) (21st century), American documentary filmmaker
 Steve Hendrickson (1966–2021), American football linebacker
 Sue Hendrickson (born 1949), American paleontologist
 Trey Hendrickson (born 1994), American football player
 Waino Edward Hendrickson (1896–1983), American politician